USB4 (official style), sometimes referred to as USB 4.0, is a technical specification that the USB Implementers Forum (USB-IF) has first released on 29 August 2019. USB4 is based on the Thunderbolt 3 protocol specification, which Intel has donated to the USB-IF. The USB4 architecture can share a single, high-speed link with multiple hardware endpoints dynamically, best serving each transfer by data type and application.

In contrast to prior USB protocol standards, USB4 mandates the exclusive use of the Type-C connector and USB Power Delivery (USB-PD) specification. USB4 products must support 20 Gbit/s throughput and can support 40 Gbit/s throughput, but because to tunneling, even nominal 20 Gbit/s can result in higher effective data rates in USB4, compared to USB 3.2, when sending mixed data. In contrast to USB 3.2, it allows tunneling of DisplayPort and PCI Express.

Support of interoperability with Thunderbolt 3 products is optional for USB4 hosts and USB4 peripheral devices, and is required for USB4 hubs on their downward facing ports and for USB4-based docks on their downward and upward facing ports. On the other hand, support for USB4 is required in Thunderbolt 4.

The USB4 2.0 specification was released on October 18, 2022, by the USB Implementers Forum, delivering 80 Gbits/s and even 120 Gbit/s in asymmetric mode.

History
USB4 was announced in March 2019. The USB4 specification version 1.0, released 29 August 2019, uses "Universal Serial Bus 4" and specifically "USB4", that is the short name branding is deliberately without a separating space versus the prior versions. Several news reports before the release of that version use the terminology "USB 4.0" and "USB 4". Even after publication of rev. 1.0, some sources write "USB 4", claiming "to reflect the way readers search".

On 1 September 2022, the USB Promoter Group announced the pending release of the USB4 Version 2.0 specification, and the specification was subsequently released on 18 October 2022.

At time of publication of version 1.0, promoter companies having employees that participated in the USB4 Specification technical work group were: Apple Inc., Hewlett-Packard, Intel, Microsoft, Renesas Electronics, STMicroelectronics, and Texas Instruments.

Goals stated in the USB4 specification are increasing bandwidth, helping to converge the USB-C connector ecosystem, and "minimize end-user confusion". Some of the key areas to achieve this are using a single USB-C connector type, while retaining compatibility with existing USB and Thunderbolt products.

On 29 April 2020, DisplayPort Alt Mode version 2.0 was released, supporting DisplayPort 2.0 over USB4.

Data transfer modes 
USB4 by itself does not provide any generic data transfer mechanism or device classes like USB 3.x, but serves mostly as a way to tunnel other protocols like USB 3.2, DisplayPort, and optionally PCIe. While it does provide a native Host-to-Host protocol, as the name implies it is only available between two connected hosts; it is used to implement Host IP Networking. Therefore, when the host and device do not support optional PCIe tunneling, the maximum non-display bandwidth is limited to USB 3.2 20 Gbit/s, while only USB 3.2 10 Gbit/s is mandatory.

USB4 specifies tunneling of:
 USB 3.2 ("Enhanced Superspeed") Tunneling
 DisplayPort 1.4a-based Tunneling
 PCI Express (PCIe)-based Tunneling

USB4 also requires support of DisplayPort Alternate Mode. That means, DP can be sent via USB4 tunneling or by DP Alternate Mode.

DisplayPort Alt Mode 2.0: USB 4 supports DisplayPort 2.0 over its alternative mode. DisplayPort 2.0 can support 8K resolution at 60 Hz with HDR10 color and can use up to 80 Gbit/s which is same amount available to USB data, but just unidirectional.

Legacy USB (1–2) is always supported using the dedicated wires in the USB-C connector.

Some transfer modes are supported by all USB4 devices, support for others is optional. The requirements for supported modes depend on the type of device.

USB4 Gen 2 is different from USB 3.2 Gen 2. They only signify the same speed, i.e. 10Gbit/s, but they are coded differently on the electrical layer.

Although USB4 is required to support dual-lane modes, it uses single-lane operations during initialization of a dual-lane link; single-lane link can also be used as a fallback mode in case of a lane bonding error.

In Thunderbolt compatibility mode, the lanes are driven slightly faster at 10.3125Gbit/s (for Gen 2) and 20.625Gbit/s (for Gen 3), as required by Thunderbolt specifications (these are called legacy speeds and rounded speeds). After removal of 64b/66b encoding, those also become round, 20.625/66*64 = 20.000 Gbit/s.

Power delivery 
USB4 requires USB Power Delivery (USB PD). A USB4 connection needs to negotiate a USB PD contract before being established. A USB4 source must at least provide 7.5W (5V, 1.5A) per port. A USB4 sink must require less than 250mA (default), 1.5A, or 3A @ 5V of power (depending on USB-C resistor configuration) before USB PD negotiation. With USB PD, up to 240W of power is possible with 'Extended power range' (5A at 48V). For 'Standard Power range' up to 100W is possible (5A at 20V).

Thunderbolt 3 compatibility 
The USB4 specification states that a design goal is to "Retain compatibility with existing ecosystem of USB and Thunderbolt products." Compatibility with Thunderbolt 3 is required for USB4 hubs; it is optional for USB4 hosts and USB4 peripheral devices. Compatible products need to implement 40 Gbit/s mode, at least 15 W of supplied power, and the different clock; implementers need to sign the license agreement and register a Vendor ID with Intel.

Pinout 

USB4 has 24 pins in a symmetrical USB type C shell. USB4 has 12 A pins on the top and 12 B pins on the bottom.

USB4 has two lanes of differential SuperSpeed pairs. Lane one uses TX1+, TX1-, RX1+, RX1- and lane two uses TX2+, TX2-, RX2+, RX2-. USB4 transfers data at 20 Gbp/s per lane. USB4 also keeps the differential D+ and D- for USB 2.0 transfer.

The CC configuration channels have the roles of creating a relationship between attached ports, detecting plug orientation due to the reversible USB type C shell, discovering the VBUS power supply pins, determining the lane ordering of the SuperSpeed lanes, and finally the USB protocol makes the CC configuration channel responsible for entering USB4 operation.

Software support
USB4 is supported by:

 Linux kernel 5.6, released on 29 March 2020
 macOS Big Sur (11.0), released on 12 November 2020
 Windows 11, released on 5 October 2021

Hardware support
During CES 2020, USB-IF and Intel stated their intention to allow USB4 products that support all the optional functionality as Thunderbolt 4 products. The first products compatible with USB4 were Intel's Tiger Lake processors, with more devices appearing around the end of 2020.

Brad Saunders, CEO of the USB Promoter Group, anticipates that most PCs with USB4 will support Thunderbolt 3, but for phones the manufacturers are less likely to implement Thunderbolt 3 support.

On 3 March 2020, Cypress Semiconductor announced new Type-C power (PD) controllers supporting USB4, CCG6DF as dual port and CCG6SF as single-port.

In November 2020, Apple unveiled MacBook Air (M1, 2020), MacBook Pro (13-inch, M1, 2020), and Mac mini (M1, 2020) featuring two USB4 ports.

List of Apple devices featuring USB4 ports include:

 MacBook Air (M2, 2022)
 MacBook Pro (13-inch, M2, 2022)
 iMac (24-inch, M1, 2021)
 MacBook Pro (13-inch, M1, 2020)
 MacBook Air (M1, 2020)
 Mac mini (M1, 2020)

AMD also stated that Zen3+ (Rembrandt) processors will support USB4. However, AMD has only announced support for USB 3.2 Gen2x2 in Zen 4 processors that were released in September 2022.

References

External links
 USB4 | USB-IF
 USB4 | USB-IF
 USB4 specifications can be downloaded from usb.org:
 USB4 Specification | USB-IF 2019-08-29
 USB4 Adopters Agreement | USB-IF 2019-08-29
 Podcast with Jit Lim from Keysight, 2019-11-21

4